Juuso Puustinen (born April 5, 1988 in Kuopio, Finland) is a Finnish professional ice hockey forward who is currently playing for Örebro HK of the Swedish Hockey League (SHL). He was selected in fifth round, 149th overall by the Calgary Flames in the 2006 NHL Entry Draft.

Playing career
Puustinen played two seasons of junior in North America for the Kamloops Blazers of the Western Hockey League before returning to Finland to begin his professional career in 2008.

Prior to the 2010–11 season, Puustinen signed a two-year, two-way deal with the Nashville Predators. After two seasons with the Predators AHL affiliate, the Milwaukee Admirals, Puustinen returned to Finland to sign a one-year contract with HIFK on May 25, 2013.

Following the 2017–18 season, his lone season with JYP Jyväskylä, Puustinen left the Liiga and decided to pursue a career in the KHL, securing a one-year contract with Russian club, HC Neftekhimik Nizhnekamsk on May 2, 2018.

After notching 20 goals in his debut 2018–19 season in the KHL with Neftekhimik Nizhnekamsk, Puustinen opted to continue in Russia, signing an improved one-year contract with HC Sibir Novosibirsk on May 1, 2019.

Puustinen left the KHL following his second season with Sibir Novosibirsk in 2020–21 and signed a one-year contract with Swedish SHL club, Örebro HK, on 3 July 2021.

Career statistics

Regular season and playoffs

International

Awards and honours

References

External links

1988 births
Calgary Flames draft picks
Espoo Blues players
Finnish ice hockey right wingers
HIFK (ice hockey) players
HPK players
JYP Jyväskylä players
Kamloops Blazers players
Living people
Milwaukee Admirals players
HC Neftekhimik Nizhnekamsk players
Örebro HK players
HC Sibir Novosibirsk players